Igor O. Girka (born 1962) is a Ukrainian physicist and specialist in plasma physics. He is the dean of the School of Physics and Technology of Kharkiv National University (since 2005), a Corresponding Member of the National Academy of Sciences of Ukraine (since 2018), and a laureate of the K. D. Sinelnikov prize of the National Academy of Sciences of Ukraine (2010). He conducts research in plasma physics, nuclear fusion, and plasma electronics.

Biography 
Girka graduated from Kharkiv University in 1985, where he has been working ever since. In 1997-1999 and since 2002 he was the head of the Department of General and Applied Physics. At the same time, in 2002–2005, he served as a Vice-Rector for Education. Since 2005 he has worked as the Dean of the School of Physics and Technology.

Research 
Girka studied the effect of plasma corrugation and helical inhomogeneity on natural frequencies and natural modes of magnetohydrodynamic waves, as well as on Alfven plasma heating. He also explained the increase in Alfven heating in the case of a maximum on the radial density profile compared with the case of the linear profile.

Honours and awards
 K. D. Sinelnikov prize of the National Academy of Sciences of Ukraine (2010)
 Winner of the regional competition "Higher School of Kharkiv Region - Best Names" in the nomination "Dean of the Faculty" (2010)
 Corresponding Member of the National Academy of Sciences of Ukraine (2018)

References

Sources 
 Гірка Ігор Олександрович // Енциклопедія сучасної України. — Київ, 2006. — Т. 5. — 10000 прим.
 Гірка Ігор Олександрович — професор Харківського національного університету імені В. Н. Каразіна. Біобібліографічний покажчик / В. О. Гірка. — Харків: ХНУ ім. В. Н. Каразіна, 2012. — 101 с.
 Biography of Igor Girka on the web page of the School of Physics and Technology.
 Girka, Igor O. in Scopus
 

1962 births
20th-century Ukrainian physicists
National University of Kharkiv alumni
Living people
Academic staff of the School of Physics and Technology of University of Kharkiv
21st-century Ukrainian physicists